The Wyoming Supreme Court is the highest court in the U.S. state of Wyoming. The Court consists of a Chief Justice and four Associate Justices. Each Justice is appointed by the Governor of Wyoming from a list of three nominees submitted by the judicial nominating commission, for an eight-year term. One year after being appointed, a new justice stands for retention in office on a statewide ballot at the next general election. If a majority votes for retention, the justice serves the remainder of the term and may stand for retention for succeeding eight-year terms by means of a nonpartisan retention ballot every eight years. A justice must be a lawyer with at least nine years' experience in the law, at least 30 years old, and a United States citizen who has resided in Wyoming for at least three years. Justices must retire when they reach 70 years of age.

The five Justices select the Chief Justice from amongst themselves. The person chosen serves as Chief Justice for four years. However, Richard V. Thomas of Cheyenne, a justice from 1974 to 2001, was chief justice only for two years (1985–1986).

Justices

Current justices

References

Notes

External links
Official site
 

Wyoming
Wyoming state courts
Cheyenne, Wyoming
Courts and tribunals with year of establishment missing